Asfaranjan (also Romanized as Asfaranjān; also known as Asfarjān) is a village in Sanjabad-e Gharbi Rural District, in the Central District of Kowsar County, Ardabil Province, Iran. At the 2006 census, its population was 85, in 16 families.

References 

Tageo

Towns and villages in Kowsar County